Stephen from the kindred Geregye (died after 1278) was a Hungarian noble, who served as ispán of Vas County in 1260.

Life
He was born into the gens Geregye as the second son of Judge royal Paul Geregye and an unidentified granddaughter of Palatine Pat Győr. Stephen had no any known descendants.

Stephen supported and assisted his elder brother Nicholas' political ambitions and aspirations without questioning. In a charters issued in 1273 he was mentioned as "former" ispán of Vas County concerning Béla IV of Hungary's royal campaign against Moravia in 1260. When Stephen V of Hungary ascended the Hungarian throne in 1270, several prominent partisans of the late Béla IV had fled the kingdom and placed themselves under the protection of Ottokar II of Bohemia. Nicholas and Stephen Geregye handed over the Dobronya Castle at Dobróváralja, Upper Hungary (today Podzámčok, Slovakia) to the Bohemian king.

The Geregye brothers returned to Hungary following the unexpected death of Stephen V in August 1272. During the early reign of the minor Ladislaus IV of Hungary, the country has fallen into anarchy. Nicholas Geregye and his brothers tried to establish dominion independently from the king in Tiszántúl, however Ladislaus IV successfully defeated and eliminated their aspirations in 1277–1278, and this branch lost all of its political influence. Their lands and estates were governed by the Borsa clan following their downfall. Stephen was last mentioned by records in 1278.

References

Sources

 

13th-century Hungarian people
Stephen
Hungarian exiles